Jean-Luc Phaneuf (October 26, 1955 – May 8, 2021) was a Canadian professional ice hockey centre who played in the World Hockey Association (WHA).

Career 
Drafted in the seventh round of the 1975 NHL Amateur Draft by the Detroit Red Wings, Phaneuf opted to play in the WHA after being selected by the Toronto Toros in the eighth round of the 1975 WHA Amateur Draft. He played parts of two WHA seasons for the Toros and Birmingham Bulls.

Awards
1974–75 QMJHL First All-Star Team
1974–75 QMJHL Frank J. Selke Memorial Trophy

References

External links

1955 births
2021 deaths
French Quebecers
Birmingham Bulls players
Buffalo Norsemen players
Canadian ice hockey centres
Charlotte Checkers (SHL) players
Detroit Red Wings draft picks
Ice hockey people from Montreal
Montreal Bleu Blanc Rouge players
Toronto Toros draft picks
Toronto Toros players